The siege of Danzig was launched by the Red Army against Nazi Germany in March 1945.

Background 
On 14 January, the 2nd Belorussian Front started an attack against the 2nd Army from their garrison in Pułtusk, and in the next ten days, they would advance quickly up the Vistula river. Danzig would eventually be reached in early March, and as it was an important strategic location and the last German stronghold in the region, the Soviets started coordinating attacks.

Course of the battle 
Acknowledging the risk of Soviet arrival in the city, general Karl-Wilhelm Specht organised the defences. He was replaced by Dietrich von Saucken due to not agreeing to Hitler's policies on the defense of the city. The Soviets began massive bombardments of Danzig on 15 March. A paratrooper unit was deployed in the Oliwa Forests (Lasy Oliwskie) on the 18th, which provoked the Soviets to enter it and start bloody fighting in the forest. The fight continued unitil 25 March and resulted in a Soviet victory. It is regarded as the most intense and bloody battle of the siege.

On the 21st, the way to Nenkau was opened. On 22 March, they entered the city from the north (through Zoppot). On the 24th, Praust was taken by the Soviets, though it wasn't an important strategic move, as the areas nearby were flooded and the main offensives were in the north and west. After the takeover of Glettkau on the 25th, Soviet tanks continued their advance towards Brösen, though it was stopped by the 62 Grenadier Regiment, which recently entrenched in the region. Intense fights would break out in the downtown in the next few days, though the fights within the city were more limited.

In the following days, Oliwa would become another centre for artillery as the Soviets progressed through the city. The 27th was an important date; Hagelsberg, a mountain in the region, was captured by the Soviets, as well as Neufahrwasser, an important port, was taken over. Now, the gasworks in the Gdańsk Shipyard were only 100 metres away from Soviet-occupied territory. Fights began in the remnants of German territory, and Śródmieście was burning. The lack of water and low accessibility caused the fire to  continue, which did not give advantages for both sides. Mass bombardments and common Soviet attacks resulted in the divisions in the centre of the city to the mouth of the Vistula and its surroundings. The Germans continued fighting, finally surrendering on 30 March.

Aftermath 
As the Germans surrendered, Danzig was left as ruins. The bombardments, constant battling and continuous fires resulted in most of the city's landmarks destroyed. On 30 March, the newly renamed Gdańsk was subject to the provisional government which created the Gdańsk Voivodeship. Mass deportation of Germans from the city started shortly after the battle in order to rise the government's popularity and manifest the new administration system. By 1946, around 68% of the German population was gone.

References 

1945 in military history
March 1945 events in Europe
1945 in Poland
1945 in Germany